Barbro Anita Inga-Britt Lorentzon (née Gyborn, 21 February 1936 – 15 June 1987) was a Swedish high jumper. She competed at the 1960 Summer Olympics and finished in sixth place.

Lorentzon won Swedish titles in the high jump in 1959 and 1960 and in the pentathlon in 1960. She held the Swedish high jump record and was an elite hurdler. Her daughters Susanne and Annika also became international athletes.

References

1936 births
1987 deaths
Swedish female high jumpers
Olympic athletes of Sweden
Athletes (track and field) at the 1960 Summer Olympics
Sportspeople from Västerås